A Good Read is one of BBC Radio 4's longest-running programmes; in it two guests join the main presenter to choose and discuss their favourite books. Sue MacGregor stepped down in 2010 as the programme's then-longest-serving presenter (seven years).  Her successor is the writer, broadcaster and academic Harriett Gilbert, who took up the reins in May 2011. Previous presenters have included the novelist Louise Doughty 1998 to 2001.

Collectively the panellists review their chosen titles. The books are always in-print paperbacks and affordable, and the reviews are honest and genuinely driven by the taste of the guests.  Recently the programme has reviewed graphic novels and books available on the internet.  It is not unusual for a guest to find themselves alone in defending their choice. Audiences see it as a simple but effective way of getting recommendations for books to read, with publishers keen to have their books featured on the programme.

The programme began in 1977 and has been produced by BBC Bristol over that time.  It is a deceptively hard programme to present as the presenter needs to read around 30 books — cover to cover — over a 12-week period and nearly 100 books for the programme in a year.

External links 
 A Good Read

References

BBC Radio 4 programmes